Come on In is a 1918 American comedy silent film directed by John Emerson and written by John Emerson and Anita Loos. The film stars Shirley Mason, Ernest Truex, Carl De Planta, Joseph Burke, Renault Tourneur, and Bernard Randall. The film was released on September 22, 1918, by Paramount Pictures. It is not known whether the film currently survives.

Plot
As described in a film magazine, after war is declared on Germany Ernest Short (Truex) enlists, and his best girl Emmy Little (Mason) determines to do her bit by running down a German spy. She falls in love with a German-American and, when he gets orders to kill an American officer, he proposes and they are married. Emmy's uncle, an army officer, is invited to the wedding. The plotters overcome the officer after the wedding and attempt to kill him. Ernest rescues the officer, trails the wedding party, and has the German placed under arrest. He and Emmy later marry.

Cast
Shirley Mason as Emmy Little
Ernest Truex as Ernest Short
Carl De Planta as Count von Bumstuff
Joseph Burke as Professor G. Wottan Orphul-Schmell
Renault Tourneur as A. Schlobb
Bernard Randall as Otto B. Schott
Blanche Craig as Mrs. schroeder
Meyer Berenson as Office Boy
Richie Ling as The Colonel
Louis Hendricks as German Spy

References

External links 
 

1918 films
1910s English-language films
Silent American comedy films
1918 comedy films
Paramount Pictures films
Lost American films
Films directed by John Emerson
American black-and-white films
American silent feature films
1918 lost films
Lost comedy films
1910s American films